Euliphyra leucyania, the lesser moth butterfly, is a butterfly in the family Lycaenidae. It is found in Sierra Leone, Liberia, Ivory Coast, Ghana, Togo, southern Nigeria, Cameroon, Gabon, the Republic of the Congo, the Democratic Republic of the Congo (Sankuru), western Uganda and north-western Tanzania. The habitat consists of forests.

Adults have a weak, moth-like flight.

The larvae live in the nests of the ant species Oecophylla longinoda (weaver ant).

References

Butterflies described in 1874
Miletinae
Butterflies of Africa
Taxa named by William Chapman Hewitson